Grimshaw Airport  is located adjacent to Grimshaw, Alberta, Canada. The airport, which had previously closed in 2008, re-opened in 2012 with new operators.

References

Registered aerodromes in Alberta